Dr.Gabriel Changson Chang is a South Sudanese politician who worked in the Ministry of Wildlife Conservation and Tourism and was the acting Minister of Finance in the Cabinet of South Sudan and the Cabinet of Sudan from March 2007 to July 2007. He was appointed to that position in July 2011 and 2009 respectively.
The Hon.Dr. Gabriel is also the chairman of the FDP South Sudan Federal Democratic Party and interim chairperson of SSOA South Sudan Opposition Alliance. On July 15, 2020, Dr.Changson was appointed the Minister of Higher Education.Dr.Changson has served in seven different ministries.Will he's ambition of  becoming the Governor of Upper Nile, yield any success?
Dr.Lew Chang is a loving father to nine children and a grandfather to five. 
Truly one of the founding fathers of South Sudan independence.

.

See also
 Ministry of Wildlife Conservation and Tourism (South Sudan)
 Cabinet of South Sudan

External links
Website of Government of South Sudan

References

Living people
Finance ministers of South Sudan
Government ministers of South Sudan
Year of birth missing (living people)
United Democratic Front (South Sudan) politicians